Federal budgets are the national budgets of federations, including:
 Australian federal budget
 Canadian federal budget
 Federal budget of Germany
 Union budget of India
 Malaysian federal budget
 Federal budget of Russia
 Scottish budget
 South African Budget
 Federal budget of Switzerland
 United States federal budget